Harry James Holman (March 15, 1862 – May 3, 1947) was an American character actor. He appeared in approximately 130 films between 1923 and 1947.

Biography

Born in Conway, Missouri, Holman dropped out of school in the ninth grade and began seeking work as an actor. In films from at least 1930, he played "a vast array of mayors, justices of the peace, attorneys, millionaires and sugar daddies". He is best known to modern audiences as the desperate Professor Richmond who tries to transform the uncouth Three Stooges into gentlemen in the film Hoi Polloi (1935). He also played frequently in the films of director Frank Capra, for example as the mayor in Meet John Doe (1941) and as the befuddled high school teacher Mr. Partridge in It's a Wonderful Life (1946).

On Broadway, Holman portrayed Wilson Prewitt in The County Chairman (1903) and Caesar Augustus Miggs in Ruled Off the Turf (1906).

Holman performed in vaudeville, heading the Harry Holman Comedy Company, which presented skits including "The Merchant Price". In 1929 or 1932, Holman left vaudeville, where he "was nationally known" for his "Hard-Boiled Hampton" comedy sketch.

On May 3, 1947, Holman died of a heart attack in Hollywood, California.

Selected filmography
 

 The Hunchback of Notre Dame (1923) - Fat Man (uncredited)
 Sporting Blood (1931) - B.H. 'Jerry' Hartwick (uncredited)
 Her Majesty, Love (1931) - Reisenfeld
 Peach O'Reno (1931) - Counselor Jackson #2 (uncredited)
 Forbidden (1932) - Advice-to-the-Lovelorn Columnist (uncredited)
 The Final Edition (1932) - Harry - Newspaperman (uncredited)
 Murders in the Rue Morgue (1932) - Victor Albert Adolph Jules Hugo Louis Dupont, the Landlord (uncredited)
 The Wet Parade (1932) - Wilson Supporter (uncredited)
 Beauty and the Boss (1932) - Hotel Manager (uncredited)
 Symphony of Six Million (1932) - Mr. Holman - Hospital Patient (uncredited)
 So Big (1932) - Country Doctor (uncredited)
 The Dark Horse (1932) - Mr. Jones
 The Final Edition (1932) - Harry
 Doctor X (1932) - Mike - Waterfront Policeman
 American Madness (1932) - Loan-Seeker (uncredited)
 The Conquerors (1932) - Stubby
 Uptown New York (1932) - Pappy, Bartender (uncredited)
 Silver Dollar (1932) - Adams
 Central Park (1932) - Police Captain (uncredited)
 Bachelor Mother (1932) - Judge Yates
 Frisco Jenny (1932) - Old Man Whose Pocket is Picked (uncredited)
 State Fair (1933) - Professor Tyler Cramp - Hog Judge (uncredited)
 Hard to Handle (1933) - Colonel's Associate (uncredited)
 The Woman Accused (1933) - Judge Osgood
 Oliver Twist (1933) - Grimwig
 Phantom Thunderbolt (1933) - Tobias Wingate (uncredited)
 The Circus Queen Murder (1933) - Jim Dugan
 Lucky Dog (1933) - The Business Man
 Song of the Eagle (1933) - 'Here's How!' Drinking Man (uncredited)
 Man Hunt (1933) - Hotel Clerk (uncredited)
 She Had to Say Yes (1933) - Mr. Hoopnagle (uncredited)
 The Stranger's Return (1933) - Dr. Spaulding (uncredited)
 Devil's Mate (1933) - McGee
 Turn Back the Clock (1933) - 1929 Spokesman (uncredited)
 One Year Later (1933) - Fat Man
 Stage Mother (1933) - Mr. Rumley (uncredited)
 The Solitaire Man (1933) - Mr. Elmer Hopkins (uncredited)
 My Woman (1933) - Lou
 Roman Scandals (1933) - Mayor of West Rome (uncredited)
 East of Fifth Avenue (1933) - Sam Cronin
 Lady Killer (1933) - J.B. Roland (uncredited)
 The Meanest Gal in Town (1934) - Brookville's Mayor (uncredited)
 It Happened One Night (1934) - last auto camp manager (uncredited)
 Jimmy the Gent (1934) - Joe Cuney (uncredited)
 The Lost Jungle (1934, Serial) - Maitland, Circus Owner [Ch.1]
 The Line-Up (1934) - Jacob (uncredited)
 A Very Honorable Guy (1934) - Fat Man (uncredited)
 Born to Be Bad (1934) - Man at Bar with Letty (uncredited)
 The Personality Kid (1934) - Diner Counterman (uncredited)
 Fugitive Road (1934) - Burgomaster
 Dames (1934) - Third Druggist (uncredited)
 The Captain Hates the Sea (1934) - Passenger (uncredited)
 I'll Fix It (1941) - Mayor Short (uncredited)
 Men of the Night (1934) - Fat Man at Pig-Stand (uncredited)
 Jealousy (1934) - Man with Dog (uncredited)
 Broadway Bill (1934) - Racetrack Rube (uncredited)
 Fugitive Lady (1934) - Mr. Young (uncredited)
 Night Alarm (1934) - Mayor Wilson
 Million Dollar Baby (1934)- J.D. Pemberton
 The Best Man Wins (1935) - Uncle Ed (uncredited)
 Calling All Cars (1935) - Judge Marlowe
 Folies Bergère de Paris (1935) - Cafe Waiter (uncredited)
 Living on Velvet (1935) - Bartender (uncredited)
 It Happened in New York (1935) - Dockman (uncredited)
 Traveling Saleslady (1935) - Pat O'Connor's Uncle
 In Caliente (1935) - Biggs
 Dante's Inferno (1935) - Jolly Fat Man (uncredited)
 Every Night at Eight (1935) - Col. Ratchfield (uncredited)
 Cheers of the Crowd (1935) - Honest John Brady
 Welcome Home (1935) - Flink
 Jalna (1935) - Mr. Cory, the Publisher (uncredited)
 Manhattan Butterfly (1935)
 Hoi Polloi (1935, Short) - Prof. Richmond (uncredited)
 Here Comes Cookie (1935) - Stuffy
 The Public Menace (1935) - Self - Made Man (scenes deleted)
 Barbary Coast (1935) - Mayor (uncredited)
 Bad Boy (1935) - Mr. Klink (uncredited)
 To Beat the Band (1935) - Chubby Diner (uncredited)
 Your Uncle Dudley (1935) - Banker (uncredited)
 The Lone Wolf Returns (1935) - Masquerade Party Nero (uncredited)
 Murder at Glen Athol (1936) - Campbell Snowden
 Hitch Hike to Heaven (1936) - Philmore Tubbs
 Gentle Julia (1936) - Grandpa Atwater
 Sinner Take All (1936) - Sgt. Berkovitch (uncredited)
 When You're in Love (1937) - A Babbitt Brother (uncredited)
 She's No Lady (1937) - Colonel (uncredited)
 Broadway Melody of 1938 (1937) - Boardinghouse Resident (uncredited)
 Nation Aflame (1937) - Roland Adams
 Professor Beware (1938) - Man Shaving on Boat (uncredited)
 The Arkansas Traveler (1938) - Telegrapher
 I Demand Payment (1938) - Justice of the Peace
 Western Jamboree (1938) - Doc Trimble
 Jesse James (1939) - Engineer (uncredited)
 I Was a Convict (1939) - Martin Harrison
 Let Us Live (1939) - J.B. - Businessman Juror (uncredited)
 Hotel Imperial (1939) - Burgomeister (uncredited)
 When Tomorrow Comes (1939) - Mr. Brown (uncredited)
 Slightly Tempted (1940) - Mayor Ammerson
 Meet John Doe (1941) - Mayor Hawkins
 Lady from Louisiana (1941) - Mayor of New Orleans (uncredited)
 The Bride Came C.O.D. (1941) - Judge Sobler
 Manpower (1941) - Justice of the Peace (uncredited)
 Public Enemies (1941) - Fat Reporter
 I Killed That Man (1941) - Lannings
 Call Out the Marines (1942) - Man in Wheelchair (uncredited)
 Too Many Women (1942) - John Cartwright
 Mexican Spitfire at Sea (1942) - Mr. Joshua Baldwin
 The Bashful Bachelor (1942) - Knute (uncredited)
 Inside the Law (1942) - Judge Mortimer Gibbs
 The Silver Bullet (1942) - Doc Winslow (uncredited)
 Shadows on the Sage (1942) - Lippy
 Seven Days' Leave (1942) - Percy Gildersleeve - Justice of the Peace
 Tennessee Johnson (1942) - Morley (uncredited)
 Keep 'Em Slugging (1943) - Fat Man (uncredited)
 Idaho (1943) - Man Leaving Church (uncredited)
 Captive Wild Woman (1943) - Dock Ticket Office Clerk (uncredited)
 Hers to Hold (1943) - Doctor (uncredited)
 Young Ideas (1943) - Harry, Court Clerk (uncredited)
 What a Man! (1944) - Harold D. Prewitt
 The Adventures of Mark Twain (1944) - Drunken Guest (uncredited)
 Allergic to Love (1944) - Club Member (uncredited)
 Swing Hostess (1944) - Fralick
 And Now Tomorrow (1944) - Santa Claus (uncredited)
 Where Do We Go from Here? (1945) - Dutch Councilman (uncredited)
 Badman's Territory (1946) - Hodge
 Without Reservations (1946) - Gas Station Attendant (uncredited)
 My Dog Shep (1946) - The Judge
 It's a Wonderful Life (1946) - Mr. Partridge (uncredited)
 Magic Town'' (1947) - Mayor (final film role)

References

External links

1872 births
1947 deaths
American male film actors
20th-century American male actors
Male actors from Missouri
American male stage actors
Broadway theatre people
Vaudeville performers